PFHS may refer to:
 Pigeon Forge High School, Pigeon Forge, Tennessee, United States
 Post Falls High School, Post Falls, Idaho, United States
 Potomac Falls High School, Sterling, Virginia, United States